The Sony Ericsson Z500a, released in December 2004, was released through Cingular Wireless and Dobson Cellular.  The phone has push-to-talk walkie-talkie functionality, but the handset was released before Cingular had rolled out their Push to Talk service.

This is a camera phone that has motion capture that can send short videos through the Multimedia Messaging System. It operates on GSM 850/1800/1900. 

The Z500a was also marketed with a Star Wars Episode III shell and assorted Star Wars ringtones and backgrounds and a demo game that could be downloaded.  Sony Ericsson offered additional Star Wars shells so that fans could choose their favorite characters/scenes.

References

Z500a
Mobile phones introduced in 2004